{{Infobox company
| name             = Incubator Games
| logo             = 
| caption          = 
| type             = Private
| genre            = 
| fate             = 
| predecessor      = 
| successor        = 
| foundation       = 2009
| founder          = 
| defunct          = 
| location_city    = Toronto, Ontario
| location_country = Canada 
| location         = 
| locations        = 
| area_served      = 
| key_people       = 
| industry         = Video games
| products         = Feeding Time, Block Star Party, ccSpark!, "Kelvin’s Space Ranch"'
| production       = 
| services         = 
| revenue          = 
| operating_income = 
| net_income       = 
| aum              = 
| assets           = 
| equity           = 
| owner            = 
| num_employees    =  
| parent           = 
| divisions        = 
| subsid           = 
| homepage         = www.incubatorgames.com/
| footnotes        = 
| intl             = 
}}

Incubator Games is an independent game studio based in Toronto, Ontario, Canada. The studio was founded in 2009 by game developers from Capybara Games who previously worked on Critter Crunch and Might and Magic: Clash of Heroes. They develop games primarily for iPhone and web browser. They released their first independently published game Feeding Time'' in 2014.

Games developed

References

External links
Official site
Official Twitter account

Companies based in Toronto
Video game companies established in 2009
Video game companies of Canada
Video game development companies